William Donald Stuart MacDonald (1862 – 31 August 1920) was a New Zealand politician, Cabinet Minister, and briefly Leader of the Opposition.

Biography

Early life
MacDonald was born in Victoria in 1862. He emigrated to Poverty Bay in New Zealand in 1882 where he became a pastoralist. Several years after arriving in New Zealand he became manager of the Bank of New Zealand estates at Gisborne in 1887, a position which he occupied until 1902. Also during this period he conducted a large amount of agricultural development work, clearing 70,000 acres of bush into farmland. He also managed several sheep stations during his career.

Member of Parliament

He was Member of the House of Representatives for the Bay of Plenty from 1908 to 1920. Unlike most of his Liberal Party colleagues MacDonald was a freeholder in regards to land ownership. He rose rapidly through the ranks and in 1910 he became senior party whip. He served as Minister of Public Works and Minister of Native Affairs in the short lived 1912 cabinet of Thomas Mackenzie. He also served in the wartime (1915–19) National cabinet as Minister of Agriculture, Minister of Mines and Minister in Charge of the Legislative, Public Buildings, Inspection of Machinery, State Fire and Accident Insurance Departments.

In 1919 MacDonald deputised several times for Sir Joseph Ward while he was overseas. On one such occasion in May he called a caucus meeting to discuss the coalition between the Liberal and Reform parties where a majority of members voted in favour of ending the arrangement upon Ward's return. MacDonald was himself unsure the correct decision was reached and he cabled Ward for his opinion, who agreed with the consensus in the caucus. Consequently, MacDonald worked with his colleagues (particularly George Warren Russell and Thomas Wilford) to develop an updated policy manifesto for the next election. Following Ward's failure to gain re-election to parliament at the 1919 general election, MacDonald assumed the leadership. A month later he was formally elected to replace him as leader of the Liberal Party unopposed. He filled that role until his death in 1920.

Death
Macdonald's health had deteriorated after he broke his arm in an accident in mid-1919. Not long before his death he took leave from his Parliamentary duties for several weeks in order to go on a health recuperating visit to Auckland, leaving his deputy Thomas Wilford to act as Leader of the Opposition. Macdonald recovered following the treatment and resumed his seat in Parliament and was still speaking in the house the day before he died.

MacDonald died suddenly in his Kelburn home of a heart attack aged 56. He left a widow, two sons and three daughters.

Notes

References

External links

Bay of Plenty MPs 1893-1941

Further reading

 ''Reprinted from the Poverty Bay Herald, Friday May 8th, 1914, p.2.''

|-

|-

|-

1862 births
1920 deaths
Australian emigrants to New Zealand
Local politicians in New Zealand
New Zealand farmers
New Zealand Liberal Party MPs
Leaders of political parties in New Zealand
Members of the Cabinet of New Zealand
People from Victoria (Australia)
Leaders of the Opposition (New Zealand)